Logo Anseba Subregion (Tigrinya: ንኡስ ዞባ ሎጐ ዓንሰባ)is a subregion in the eastern Gash-Barka Region (logo Anseba) of Eritrea. Its capital lies at Logo Anseba.

Location
The region is bordered by the Anseba, Maekel and Debub regions and situated in the highlands of Eritrea. It sits at an altitude between 1600–2400 meters above sea level, with a semi-arid climate.

Demographics
The total population of Logo Anseba is 33,446; it is composed of 13 Kebabis, and 22 villages.

Tigrigna is the main spoken language in the region.

Economy
Most of the inhabitants of Logo Anseba live by farming, cultivating wheat, sorghum, finger millet and pulses. 
During the dry season from November to March, the inhabitants perform other work such as trade and construction.

Geography
Logo Anseba is the origin for one of the main rivers, the Barka River, which flows all the way into Sudan.

Kebabis of Logo Anseba

 Dersenei
 Deki Zeru
 Adi Na’amen
 Mellezanai
 Deki Shehai
 Mekerka
 Adi-Hans
 Liban
 Adena
 Habela
 Deida
 Kerena Khudo
 Tslale
 Deki-Dashim
Debri
 Adi-Werhiseb

References

Subregions of Eritrea

Gash-Barka Region
Subregions of Eritrea